Gonzalo Suárez Llano (born 22 April 1994), sometimes known simply as Gonzalo, is a Spanish footballer who plays for CD San Roque de Lepe as a forward.

Football career
Suárez was born in Coria del Río, Seville, Andalusia on 29 April 1994, and who played youth football with Sevilla FC. In August 2012, still a junior, he began appearing professionally with the B-team in Segunda División B.

He made his official debut with the main squad on 9 January 2013, playing the last 11 minutes as a substitute for Baba Diawara in a 1–2 home loss against RCD Mallorca for the season's Copa del Rey.

References

External links

1994 births
Living people
People from Coria del Río
Sportspeople from the Province of Seville
Spanish footballers
Footballers from Andalusia
Association football forwards
Segunda División B players
Tercera División players
Sevilla Atlético players
Sevilla FC players
Mérida AD players
CE Europa footballers
CD San Roque de Lepe footballers